is a village located in Aomori Prefecture, Japan. , the village had an estimated population of 1,673 in 864 households, and a population density of 24 persons per km2.

Geography
The northernmost municipality on Honshū island, Kazamaura is on the northwestern shore of Shimokita Peninsula. It is separated from the island of Hokkaidō by the Tsugaru Strait. Most of the village is part of the Osoreyama Mountain Range, resulting in little flat land. The Ikokuma River flows through the village. Approximately 96% of the total area of the village is covered by forests.  Much of the village is within the borders of the Shimokita Hantō Quasi-National Park.

Neighboring municipalities
Aomori Prefecture
Mutsu
Ōma

Climate
The village has a cold oceanic climate characterized by cool short summers and long cold winters with heavy snowfall and strong winds. (Köppen climate classification Cfb).  The average annual temperature in Kazamaura is 8.7 °C. The average annual rainfall is 1259 mm with September as the wettest month. The temperatures are highest on average in August, at around 21.5 °C, and lowest in January, at around -2.9 °C.

Demographics
Per Japanese census data, the population of Kazamaura has declined over the past 60 years, and is now half of what it was a century ago.

History

Government
Kazamaura has a mayor-council form of government with a directly elected mayor and a unicameral village council of eight members. Sai is part of Shimokita District which, together with the city of Mutsu, contributes three members to the Aomori Prefectural Assembly. In terms of national politics, the city is part of Aomori 1st district of the lower house of the Diet of Japan.

Economy
The economy of Kazamaura is heavily dependent on forestry and commercial fishing (particularly for squid, sea urchin and konbu).

Education
Kazamaura has one public elementary school, and one public middle school operated by the village government. The village does not have a high school.

Transportation

Railway
The village has no passenger railway service. The nearest train station is Shimokita Station on the JR East Ōminato Line.

Highway

Local attractions
Shimofuro Onsen - A sulphur hot spring resort known for its view of the many fishing boat lights that shine on the Tsugaru Strait after sunset.
Kuwabata Onsen,- a hot spring resort
Isaribi Strait Park
Squid Centre - A center for supplying fresh squid
Ikokuma River - A  mountain river noted for its scenic foliage season and fishing.

References

External links 

Official Website 

Villages in Aomori Prefecture
Populated coastal places in Japan
Kazamaura, Aomori